Octamerella is an extinct genus of prehistoric nautiloids from the oncocerid family Hemiphragmoceratidae that lived in what is now Europe and North America during the Middle Silurian.

Octamerella has a breviconic shell and a mature aperture that is contracted so as to have four pairs of dorsolateral sinuses, four on each side, and a narrow mid-dorsal salient. The two ventral-most sinus pairs are typically the largest, while the dorsal-most pair is short and wide, forming a circular opening.

References

 Sweet, W.C. 1964. Nautilodea-Oncocerida; Treatise on Invertebrate Paleontology, Part K; Geol Soc of America and Univ Kansas Press, Teichert & Moore eds.
 Sepkoski, J.J. Jr. 2002. A compendium of fossil marine animal genera. D.J. Jablonski & M.L. Foote (eds.). Bulletins of American Paleontology 363: 1–560. Sepkoski's Online Genus Database (CEPHALOPODA)
 Fossilworks: Octamerella

Oncocerida
Silurian cephalopods
Silurian animals of Europe
Silurian cephalopods of North America
Prehistoric nautiloid genera